Underground Vol. 1: 1991–1994 is a collection of songs recorded when Three 6 Mafia first started their rap career. These songs have been taken from their underground mixtapes and albums such as DJ Paul & Juicy J's Vol. 1–3 mixtapes, DJ Paul & Lord Infamous' mixtapes, Juicy J's mixtapes and the Triple Six Mafia's Smoked Out, Loced Out tape.

Track listing 
All tracks produced by DJ Paul and Juicy J.
 "Ridin' 'N' "Tha" Chevy Pt. 2 – DJ Paul & Lord Infamous feat. Juicy J
 "Niggaz Ain't Barin Dat – Triple Six Mafia
 "Chargin' These Hoes – DJ Paul & Juicy J
 "Now I'm High, Really High (original version)" – Triple Six Mafia
 "Sucks On Dick (original version)" – Juicy J
 "Playa Hataz (original version)" – Triple Six Mafia
 "Paul With Da 45" – DJ Paul & Lord Infamous
 "Where Da Bud At" (Officially "Stop") – Lord Infamous
 "Mask and Da Glock" (Officially "Victim Of a Driveby") – Lil' Glock & S.O.G.
 "Don't Be Scared – Juicy J
 "Time For Da Juice Mane" (Officially "Stomp") – Juicy J
 "Walk Up To Your House – DJ Paul & Juicy J
 "Yeah, They Done Fucked Up – DJ Paul
 "Talk Ya Ass Off" – DJ Paul
 "Fuck All Dem Hoes" – DJ Paul & Juicy J

1999 compilation albums
Three 6 Mafia compilation albums
Albums produced by DJ Paul
Albums produced by Juicy J